John Chalmers may refer to:

 John Chalmers (missionary) (1825–1899), Scottish Protestant missionary in China and translator
 John Chalmers (coach) (1874–1962), American football, basketball and baseball coach
 John Alan Chalmers (1904–1967), British atmospheric physicist
 John Chalmers (trade unionist) (1915–1983), Scottish trade unionist
 John Chalmers (surgeon) (born 1927), Scottish orthopaedic surgeon
 John Chalmers (medical researcher) (born 1937), Australian medical researcher
 John Chalmers (moderator), minister of the Church of Scotland
 One half of the duo (with Sandra Marrs) who creates comic books under the pseudonym Metaphrog